is a Japanese long-distance runner. In 2019, he represented Japan at the 2019 World Athletics Championships held in Doha, Qatar and he competed in the men's marathon. He finished in 37th place.

References

External links 
 

Living people
1994 births
Place of birth missing (living people)
Japanese male long-distance runners
Komazawa University alumni
Japanese male marathon runners
World Athletics Championships athletes for Japan
21st-century Japanese people